Anthony Howard Goldwyn (born May 20, 1960) is an American actor, singer, producer, director, and political activist. He made his debut appearing as Darren in the slasher film Friday the 13th Part VI: Jason Lives (1986), and had his breakthrough for starring as Carl Bruner in the fantasy thriller film Ghost (1990), which earned him a nomination for the Saturn Award for Best Supporting Actor. He went on to star as Harold Nixon in the biographical film Nixon (1995), which earned him a Screen Actors Guild Award nomination, and as Neil Armstrong in the HBO miniseries From the Earth to the Moon (1998).

Goldwyn voiced the main character in the Disney animated film Tarzan (1999), and portrayed Colonel Bagley in The Last Samurai (2003), Johnathon "John" Collingwood in the horror film The Last House on the Left (2009), Andrew Prior in the Divergent film series (2014–2015) and Paul Cohen in King Richard (2021), the latter of which earned him a second nomination for a Screen Actors Guild Award. He starred as President Fitzgerald Grant III in the ABC legal/political drama Scandal (2012–2018) and directed a number of episodes for the series, for which he won a Peabody Award.

Early life
Goldwyn was born in Los Angeles, California, the son of actress Jennifer Howard and film producer Samuel Goldwyn Jr. Goldwyn's paternal grandparents were mogul Samuel Goldwyn, a Polish Jewish immigrant from Warsaw, and actress Frances Howard, who was originally from Nebraska. His maternal grandparents were playwright Sidney Howard and actress Clare Eames. One of his maternal great-great-grandfathers was Maryland Governor and Senator William Thomas Hamilton. Goldwyn attended Hamilton College in Clinton, New York, Brandeis University in Waltham, Massachusetts (where he received his Bachelor of Fine Arts degree), and the London Academy of Music and Dramatic Art. He additionally studied acting at HB Studio in New York City.

Career

Following his departure from drama school, Goldwyn began acting in guest star roles in the mid-1980s. Goldwyn had his breakthrough for playing Carl Bruner, friend-turned-betrayer of Patrick Swayze's character Sam Wheat, in the fantasy thriller film Ghost. The film earned positive reviews, and won the Academy Award for Best Original Screenplay. For his performance, Goldwyn earned a nomination for the Saturn Award for Best Supporting Actor. Goldwyn appeared on the comedy series Designing Women, in which he played a young interior designer named Kendall Dobbs, an HIV-positive man who was dying from AIDS and who asked the women of Sugarbakers to design his funeral. In the HBO miniseries From the Earth to the Moon, Goldwyn played astronaut Neil Armstrong, commander of Apollo 11. He also voiced the title character in the 1999 animated feature film Tarzan which was produced by Walt Disney Feature Animation and grossed over $400 million. He reprised the role in the video games Disney's Tarzan Untamed and Kingdom Hearts.

Goldwyn had a recurring role on the NBC-Universal drama Law & Order: Criminal Intent as Frank Goren, brother of lead character Robert Goren, played by Vincent D'Onofrio. He also had acting and directing duties for the first season of Dexter for Showtime (brother John Goldwyn is executive producer). As a stage actor, Goldwyn has appeared twice in Off-Broadway shows at Second Stage Theatre and on Broadway at Circle in the Square Theatre.  At Second Stage Theatre he appeared in Theresa Rebeck's Spike Heels (1992) alongside Kevin Bacon and Julie White.  In the summer of 2006 at Second Stage Theatre he starred opposite Kate Burton in another Rebeck play, The Water's Edge. Goldwyn played J. D. Sheldrake, the philandering business executive, in the Broadway musical Promises, Promises starring Sean Hayes and Kristin Chenoweth. The cast recording was released on June 23, 2010, with Goldwyn in three tracks.

Goldwyn played Captain von Trapp (opposite Laura Osnes as Maria) in a concert performance of The Sound of Music at Carnegie Hall on April 25, 2012. The benefit included opera singer Stephanie Blythe as the Mother Abbess, Brooke Shields as Baroness Schraeder and Patrick Page as Max. As a director, Goldwyn has directed four feature films, A Walk on the Moon, Someone Like You, The Last Kiss, and Conviction. He has also directed many episodes of television series such as Without a Trace, The L Word, Dexter, Law & Order: Criminal Intent, Grey's Anatomy and Scandal. In 2014, he directed the pilot episode of the WE tv series, The Divide, of which he also served as executive producer along with Oscar-nominated screenwriter Richard LaGravenese. Goldwyn starred as President Fitzgerald Grant III in the ABC legal/political drama Scandal from 2012 to 2018. In 2013, Goldwyn was cast in the Lifetime original movie, Outlaw Prophet, as Warren Jeffs. In 2014, he appeared in Divergent as Andrew Prior, Caleb (Ansel Elgort) and Tris' (Shailene Woodley) father. In 2015, he signed on to star in James Gunn's horror thriller film The Belko Experiment. In June 2018, Goldwyn was cast as Ben Lefevre in the Netflix supernatural series Chambers. On 20 January 2021 during the inauguration of Joe Biden, Goldwyn was the host of the Virtual Parade Across America aired on television networks, organized by the Biden Inaugural Committee. Also in 2021, Goldwyn appeared in King Richard, which was acclaimed and earned several accolades.

Personal life
Goldwyn has been married to production designer Jane Michelle Musky (born 27 May 1954) since 1987. They have two daughters, Anna and Tess. Additionally, Goldwyn's brother John is a former executive of Paramount Pictures and the executive producer of Dexter. His brother Peter is also a film producer and the current President of Samuel Goldwyn Films. A former president of the Creative Coalition, Goldwyn is also heavily involved with arts advocacy. He is also a spokesperson of the AmeriCares Foundation. 

Goldwyn was an avid supporter of Hillary Clinton and in 2016 directed a commercial featuring his Scandal co-star Kerry Washington, as well as Viola Davis, Ellen Pompeo, and Shonda Rhimes to support Clinton's presidential campaign. Goldwyn also serves as an ambassador for The Innocence Project, a non-profit organization that works to exonerate the wrongfully convicted and reform the criminal justice system and on the Board of Governors for the Motion Picture & Television Fund (MPTF).

Filmography

Film

Television

Video games

Director

Audiobook

Stage

Discography

Awards and nominations

References

External links

1960 births
Living people
20th-century American male actors
21st-century American male actors  
21st-century American Jews
Alumni of the London Academy of Music and Dramatic Art
American male film actors
American male television actors
American male voice actors
American male video game actors
American people of Irish descent
American people of Polish-Jewish descent
American television directors 
American political activists 
Brandeis University alumni
Film directors from California
Tony
Hamilton College (New York) alumni
Jewish American male actors
Male actors from Los Angeles
Writers from Brooklyn
Writers Guild of America Award winners
Jewish singers
Audiobook narrators
Disney people